William Wade Ellis (1751 – 1785) was an artist, a naturalist, and a surgeon's mate on Captain James Cook's voyages. His middle name was wrongly identified as Webb in some sources. He is known largely from the paintings of natural history subjects that he made during Captain Cook's voyages.
Ellis was baptized on 11 June 1751 at Ely Cathedral, born to Thomas, canon at Ely Cathedral, and Elizabeth. A brother became a vicar at Melbourn, Cambridgeshire. Little is known of his early life, but he was described by David Samwell, surgeon on HMS Discovery, as "a genteel young fellow and of good education". He served on all three of Captain Cook's voyages and may have improved his artistic skills through the influence of John Webber after moving from the HMS Discovery to the HMS Resolution. Descriptions of specimens in his notebooks suggest that he was scientifically trained and had a knowledge of Latin but claims that he trained at Cambridge University and at St. Bartholomew's Hospital have not been supported by evidence. 

Ellis met Joseph Banks and gave him some of his drawings hoping to be remunerated and owing to financial difficulties he took up an offer to write an account of the third voyage which was published in 1782 but was not paid for the book sales due to breach of terms in the contract.  In 1785 he went to join the Queen Charlotte on a voyage to northwest America but he had an accident at Ostend, Belgium. Ellis fell from the mast of the ship and died from his injuries.

References

External links 
 Biography
 An authentic narrative of a voyage performed by Captain Cook and Captain Clerke (1784)

English naturalists
1751 births
1785 deaths
People from Ely, Cambridgeshire
Wildlife artists